Dangal is a Hindi language general entertainment channel. It is a 24 Hours free to air channel.

History
Dangal was the most watched Hindi language channel in U+R category from week 13 of 2019 to week 26 of 2020. It is owned by Enterr10 Television Pvt. Ltd.

Programming
List of programmes broadcast by Dangal TV

References

External links
 Official website

Hindi-language television channels in India
Hindi-language television stations
Television stations in New Delhi